Founded in 2008 at Beijing, the Beijing Queer Chorus (北京酷儿合唱团) is now, with around 60 regular performing members, the first public performing LGBT chorus in mainland China. BQC is a member of the GALA Choruses.

The Chorus was known as Shining Jazzy Chorus.

Introduction

Beijing Queer Chorus (BQC) is a semiprofessional mixed choir founded in 2008. It is the first publicly performing LGBT+ choir in Mainland China, and is one of the first two Asian choirs attending international LGBT choral festivals. BQC currently has over 100 members registered.

To practice the idea "Sing for a Better World", BQC conducts various public music events on a regular base and actively participate in music communications domestically and internationally. After attending LGBT Chorus festival around the world for several times, it jointly hosted the first Queer Chorus Festival in Mainland China along with six LGBT+ choirs. Through chorus shows and cultural communication in Tianjin, Hong Kong, Taipei, Tokyo, London, Seattle, Portland etc., chorus members hope to break down the barriers among individuals and groups.

BQC has collaborated with partners including the British, Dutch, and German embassies in Beijing, China, TEDx, VICE China, and the Broadway Musical RENT. It also promotes AIDS prevention activities and attends environmental protection events.

Recent history

The chorus was founded in October 2008 as the Shining Jazzy Chorus. Currently, they perform two concerts each year. In June 2013, they performed with Seattle Men's Chorus assistant director, Eric Lane Barnes. The following month of that year, they met with Gary Locke. In April 2014, they changed their name to the Beijing Queer Chorus.  In the same year, two BQC singers attended Various Voices Dublin 2014. In July 2016, 14 BQC singers attended the GALA choruses festival in Denver, U.S. In December 2016, they celebrates 8th anniversary. In March 2018, they toured Northwestern U.S.

References

External links
 Official website 
 music collection at Douban

LGBT culture in Beijing
Musical groups established in 2008
Chinese choirs
LGBT choruses
LGBT organizations based in China
Organizations based in Beijing
2008 establishments in China
Musical groups from Beijing